Kajang Bypass is the 7.5-km main arterial bypass in Kajang, Selangor, Malaysia. It connects the Cheras–Kajang Expressway / and the Kajang–Seremban Highway . Kajang Bypass is one of the three highway projects being constructed to ease the congestion of Kajang town centre.

Route background
The Kajang Bypass begins as the continuation of the Cheras–Kajang Expressway /. At Exit 708 Saujana Impian Interchange, the Cheras–Kajang Expressway / is downgraded into an arterial road and becomes the Kajang Bypass before once again being upgraded to a controlled-access expressway and continues as the Kajang–Seremban Highway .

The bypass is divided into 3 main section. The first section from Exit 708 Saujana Impian Interchange to Sungai Kantan is managed by Kajang Municipal Council. The second section from Sungai Kantan to Exit 1805 Kajang Perdana Interchange is managed by the Malaysian Public Works Department (JKR). The final section from Exit 1805 Kajang Perdana Interchange to Exit 2101 Kajang South Interchange is a part of the Kajang–Seremban Highway .

History 

The Kajang Bypass was constructed to relieve the congestion in the town centre of Kajang, together with the Kajang Dispersal Link Expressway  and the Kajang–Seremban Highway . The construction was started in 1997 and was supposed to be completed in 2000; however, the bypass could not be completed on time due to delays of the construction of the Kajang–Seremban Highway  project. The final section from Kajang Perdana to Jalan Semenyih FT1 was only completed in 2004 and was opened to traffic on 15 March 2004.

The Kajang Bypass was constructed at the cost of RM 20 million.

List of interchanges

References

Highways in Malaysia
Malaysian Federal Roads
Bypass